Magyar Testgyakorlók Köre Budapest Futball Club or shortly MTK is a Hungarian football club based in Józsefváros, Budapest. The team currently plays in the Nemzeti Bajnokság II. The club's colours are blue and white. As one of the most successful Hungarian football clubs, MTK has won the Hungarian League 23 times and the Hungarian Cup 12 times. The club has also won the Hungarian Super Cup twice. In 1955, as Vörös Lobogó SE, they became the first Hungarian team to play in the European Cup and in 1964 they finished as runners-up in the European Cup Winners' Cup after losing to Sporting Clube de Portugal in the final. 
The club founded the Sándor Károly Football Academy in 2001. The Academy also has a partnership agreement with English club Liverpool.

History

MTK Budapest first entered the Nemzeti Bajnokság in the 1903 season. In the subsequent season, MTK won their first domestic title. Between 1913 and 1914 and 1924–25, MTK dominated Hungarian football by winning ten titles in a row.

Crest and colours

Manufacturers and shirt sponsors
The following table shows in detail MTK Budapest FC kit manufacturers and shirt sponsors by year:

Stadia and facilities

MTK Budapest's first stadium was opened in 1912. The first match was played MTK Budapest's main rival Ferencváros on 31 March 1912. The final result was 1–0 to MTK.

MTK Budapest's second stadium was built in 1947 shortly after the end of the World War II. It was demolished in 2014 to construct a brand-new stadium on its place.

Hidegkuti Nándor Stadion is a multi-purpose stadium in Budapest, Hungary. It was renamed after the MTK Budapest and Hungary footballer Nándor Hidegkuti. It is currently used for football matches and is the home stadium of MTK Budapest.

Lantos Mihály Sportközpont is sport centre located in Zugló, Budapest. It was built in 1896. It has a capacity of 3,500 (2,500 seated).It was home to Budapest Micro Club, MTK Maccabi, Rower-Veled Érted Se, Vörös Meteor Egyetértés SK, Zuglói Kinizsi SE.

Rivalry

The fixture between MTK Budapest FC and Ferencvárosi TC is called the Örökrangadó or Eternal derby. The first fixture was played in the 1903 Nemzeti Bajnokság I season. It is the oldest football rivalry in Hungary.

Honours

Domestic
Nemzeti Bajnokság I
Winners (23): 1904, 1907–08, 1913–14, 1916–17, 1917–18, 1918–19, 1919–20, 1920–21, 1921–22, 1922–23, 1923–24, 1924–25, 1928–29, 1935–36, 1936–37, 1951, 1953, 1957–58, 1986–87, 1996–97, 1998–99, 2002–03, 2007–08
Runners-up (20): 1909–10, 1910–11, 1911–12, 1912–13, 1925–26, 1927–28, 1930–31, 1932–33, 1939–40, 1948–49, 1949–50, 1952, 1954, 1955, 1957, 1958–59, 1962–63, 1989–90, 1999–2000, 2006–07
Magyar Kupa
Winners (12): 1909–10, 1910–11, 1911–12, 1913–14, 1922–23, 1924–25, 1931–32, 1951–52, 1968, 1996–97, 1997–98, 1999–2000
Runners-up: 1934–35, 1975–76, 2011–12
Szuperkupa
 Winners: 2003, 2008

International
Mitropa Cup
Winners: 1955, 1963
Runners-up: 1959
European Cup Winners' Cup
Runner-up: 1963–64
Inter-Cities Fairs Cup
Semi-finalist: 1961–62

Friendly
Štefánik Tournament in Bratislava
 Winners: 1933

Players

Current squad

Out on loan

Non-playing staff

Board of directors

Management

Managerial history

Seasons

In European football

See also
Örökrangadó
Vörös Meteor Egyetértés SK

Sources
Behind The Curtain – Travels in Eastern European Football: Jonathan Wilson (2006) Behind the Curtain: Travels in Football in Eastern Europe: Amazon.co.uk: Wilson, Jonathan: 9780752869070: Books

References

External links

Official Website 
Article on MTK at www.uefa.com
European Cup 1955–56
Soccerway profile
Matches, old tickets, ground photos at magyarfutball.hu

 
Football clubs in Budapest
Association football clubs established in 1888
1888 establishments in Hungary